Epps Township is one of ten townships in Butler County, Missouri, USA.  As of the 2010 census, its population was 3,171.

Epps Township was established in 1850, and named after Obadiah Epps, an early settler.

Geography
It contains three cemeteries: Houts, Kearbey (Kearbey Chapel Cemetery) and Sparkman.

The streams of Beehole Branch, Camp Branch, Crooked Branch, Goose Creek, Harmon Branch, Hurricane Creek, Procter Branch and Ten Mile Creek run through this township.

References

External links
 US-Counties.com
 City-Data.com

Townships in Butler County, Missouri
Townships in Missouri